A barrier transfer machine, also known as zipper machine or road zipper, is a type of heavy vehicle that is used to transfer concrete lane dividers, such as jersey barriers, which are used to relieve traffic congestion during rush hours.  Many other cities use them temporarily during construction work.  The lanes created by the machine are sometimes referred to as "zipper lanes".

One advantage of barrier systems over other lane management treatments such as traffic cones or overhead directional lights is that a solid, positive barrier prevents vehicle collisions due to motorists crossing over into opposing traffic flow.  A disadvantage is that lane widths can be slightly reduced.

History 
The Road Zipper variant has been in existence since 1984–1985.  Auckland Harbour Bridge had its original moveable barrier system installed in 1990. The Hawaii Department of Transportation debuted a zipper Lane on Oahu on August 18, 1998. The Benjamin Franklin Bridge has had a permanent barrier transfer system since 2000, when it was installed by the Delaware River Port Authority. A movable barrier system was introduced in Sydney, NSW, Australia, in 2012. The Golden Gate Bridge had a permanent  movable barrier system installed in January 2015.

Operation 
The vehicle contains an S-shaped, inverted conveyor channel in its undercarriage which lifts the barrier segments (which may weigh over ) off the road surface and transfers them over to the other side of the lane, reallocating traffic lanes to accommodate increased traffic for the currently dominant (peak) direction These barriers are linked together with steel connectors to create a sturdy but flexible safety barrier.

The length can vary based on application and the amount of barrier needed to effectively deflect an errant vehicle.

Some barrier systems have four rubber feet on the bottom of each segment “to increase the coefficient of friction between the barrier element and the road surface”.  This helps the barrier resist vehicle impact and keeps the barrier from moving significantly if struck.

Some models of the machine hold  of barrier at a time as they are engaged in transferring. The machine can transfer within the regular traffic flow without hindering other vehicles:

Upon completing its pass, some barrier transfer machines can be moved across outside traffic lanes away from the area.  However, other systems simply park in a median between their movable barrier and an affixed barrier to keep them from impeding traffic flow.  A barrier transfer machine that operates outside of Honolulu has its own garage in the space between viaducts.

Permanent locations 
Moveable barriers are in permanent use in such cities as

Variants 
The Road Zipper brand movable barrier model is one vehicle, piloted by two operators located at opposite ends of it, typically at a 25 degree angle (the “crab angle”) along the barrier.  Sophisticated models can be customized for their application and local road characteristics (grades, curves, etc.).  Hydraulically adjustable units and computerized steering guidance systems in such models further aid in accurate transfer vehicle movement and barrier placement.   Permanent, sophisticated units can cost around US$1 million each.

Another variant of the machine uses two narrower machines running in tandem. This setup tends to be used in reversible lanes (also known as contraflow lanes) when the movable barrier is used to divide two directions of traffic—the narrower machines are less of an impediment to traffic in either direction.

See also

References

Road transport
Automotive safety
Articles containing video clips